Alexander Francis Marinos  (born 1 February 1949) is an Australian actor. Notable for his acting role as Bruno, the Italian son-in-law of Ted Bullpitt, on the 1980s Australian comedy television series Kingswood Country and as host of Late Night Legends on ABC2, he was also a presenter on radio station Double Jay (2JJ, now Triple J) in the late 1970s with Ted Robinson.

Biography
Marinos was born on 1 February 1949 in Wagga Wagga, New South Wales, the son of a Greek immigrant father, Fotios ("Frank") Marinopoulos and Greek-Australian mother, Anne Karofilis who was the daughter of Adonis ("Tony") Karofilis, a Greek migrant from Kassos, Greece and Minnie Matheson, an Australian of English origin, with descent going back to an English couple, Samuel Bradley, a convict, and Marian Mortimer, a free migrant who immigrated to Hobart, Tasmania in the 19th century, who are Marinos's maternal great-great-great-grandparents. He graduated from the University of New South Wales with a Bachelor of Arts degree with honours in Drama.

Honours and awards
Marinos was awarded the Medal of the Order of Australia (OAM) for his services to the performing arts. He is also a former Deputy Chair of the Australia Council and the Community Cultural Development Fund of the Australia Council.

In 2008 he delivered the 10th annual Tom Brock Lecture.

He won with fellow cast at the Equity Awards for Most Outstanding Performance by an Ensemble In A Television Movie or Mini-Series.

Filmography

As actor
Glitch (2017) – Steve Tripidakis
Rake (2014) - Spiro
The Slap (2011) – Manolis
Lunchtime (2005) (voice) – Narrator
Pizza (2000) – Lawyer
Water Rats (1996) – Bellamy
Bedevil (1993) – Dimitri
A Country Practice (1993)
The Last Days of Chez Nous (1992) – Angelo
Embassy (1990) TV Series – Tariq Abdullah (1991–92)
Pandemonium (1988) – Detective Sergeant Dick Dickerson
City West (1984) TV Series – Tim Pappas
Goodbye Paradise (1983) – Con
Hoodwink (1981) –
Kingswood Country (1980) – Bruno (1979–1984)
Cathy's Child (1979) – Con Havros
Chopper Squad (1978)
King's Men
Matlock Police (1975) - Kevin Hanson
Scattergood: Friend of All (1975) TV Series
The Aunty Jack Show (1972)
The Rovers

As television director
A Country Practice (1994) TV Series
Gillies and Company (1992) TV Series
Boundaries of the Heart (1988)
Hard Knuckle (1987) (TV)
Perhaps Love (1987) (TV)
An Indecent Obsession (1985)
Remember Me (1985) (TV)
Bodyline (1984) TV miniseries

References

1949 births
Australian male film actors
Australian television directors
Australian male television actors
Australian male voice actors
Living people
Australian people of Greek descent
Australian people of English descent
Triple J announcers
People from Wagga Wagga
Recipients of the Medal of the Order of Australia
People educated at North Sydney Boys High School
20th-century Australian male actors
21st-century Australian male actors